The 2018 Women's Twenty20 Asia Cup was the seventh edition of the ACC Women's Asia Cup, organized by the Asian Cricket Council (ACC). It took place between 3 and 10 June 2018 in Malaysia, and was the third edition played as a 20-over tournament. The tournament was contested between Bangladesh, India, Malaysia, Pakistan, Sri Lanka and Thailand. India were the defending champions.

On 6 June 2018, during the group stage, Bangladesh beat India by seven wickets. This was Bangladesh's first win against India in a women's international cricket match, and India's first ever loss in the Asia Cup. On 9 June 2018, Thailand beat Sri Lanka by four wickets to register their first ever win against a Full Member side.

India were the first team to advance to the final, after they beat Pakistan by seven wickets in their final group game. They were joined by Bangladesh, who beat Malaysia by 70 runs in their final match. It was India's seventh consecutive Asia Cup final and the first for Bangladesh. Bangladesh beat India by three wickets in the final to win their first Asia Cup title, and became the only other team to win the title besides India.

A month after the conclusion of the tournament, the International Cricket Council (ICC) retrospectively gave all the fixtures full Women's Twenty20 International (WT20I) status.

Squads

Points table

Matches
The fixtures were confirmed by the ACC:

1st match

2nd match

3rd match

4th match

5th match

6th match

7th match

8th match

9th match

10th match

11th match

12th match

13th match

14th match

15th match

Final

Broadcasters

Bangladesh - GTV
India- STAR NETWORK

References

External links
 Series home at ESPN Cricinfo

2018
Cricket
Cricket
International cricket competitions in 2018
International cricket competitions in Malaysia
2018 in women's cricket
June 2018 sports events in Malaysia